"Harley + Rose" is a song by Australian blues and rock band The Black Sorrows. It was released in July 1990 as the first single from their sixth studio album Harley and Rose. It peaked at 24 on the ARIA Charts in September 1990.

At the ARIA Music Awards of 1991, the song was nominated for ARIA Award for Song of the Year, losing to "Burn for You" by John Farnham.

At the APRA Music Awards of 1991, "Harley + Rose" won Country Song of the Year.

Track listing
Australian 7" single (656127 7)
 "Harley + Rose" – 3:51
 "The Calling" – 2:47

UK 12" single (656214 8)
 "Harley + Rose"	
 "The Calling"	
 "Rattle Your Cage" 	
 "The Chosen Ones"

Charts

References

1990 singles
The Black Sorrows songs
Songs written by Joe Camilleri
APRA Award winners
Song recordings produced by Joe Camilleri